Berkshiria albistylum is a species of soldier fly in the family Stratiomyidae.

References

Stratiomyidae
Insects described in 1914
Taxa named by Charles Willison Johnson
Insects of Canada
Diptera of Europe
Diptera of North America